ISBL (Information Systems Base Language) is the relational algebra notation that was invented for PRTV, one of the earliest database management systems to implement E.F. Codd's relational model of data.

Example
 OS = ORDERS * SUPPLIERS
 LIST OS: NAME="Brooks" % SNAME, ITEM, PRICE

See also
 IBM Business System 12 - An IBM industrial strength relational DBMS influenced by ISBL.  It was developed for use by customers of IBM's time-sharing service bureaux in various countries in the early 1980s.

External links
 Sample ISBL usage

Query languages